Puget is a commune in the Vaucluse department in the Provence-Alpes-Côte d'Azur region in southeastern France.

Personalities
The troubadour Bertran del Pojet hailed from Pojet, the Occitan name of modern Puget.

See also
Côtes du Luberon AOC
Communes of the Vaucluse department
Luberon

References

Communes of Vaucluse